Maplelawn Farmstead is a historic home and farm located at Eagle Township, Boone County, Indiana.  The farmhouse was built about 1860, with several later additions.  It is a two-story, frame I-house sheathed in clapboard.  It has Gothic Revival, Queen Anne and American Craftsman style design elements.  It features a full-width, one-story enclosed front porch.  Also on the property are the contributing large Maplelawn English barn (c. 1900–1925), dairy barn (c. 1900–1925), corn crib, summer kitchen, two chicken coops, goose house, two hog houses, privy, small dog house, and garage.

It was listed on the National Register of Historic Places in 2011.

References

External links

Farms on the National Register of Historic Places in Indiana
Gothic Revival architecture in Indiana
Queen Anne architecture in Indiana
Houses completed in 1860
Houses in Boone County, Indiana
National Register of Historic Places in Boone County, Indiana